The men's individual foil competition at the 2018 Asian Games in Jakarta was held on 21 August at the Jakarta Convention Center. This event made its debut at the Asian Games since the seventh edition in 1974 Tehran. China led the medal tally by collecting five gold medals, while Japan and South Korea stand in the second and third position with 3 and 2 gold medals respectively. Huang Mengkai of China managed to claim the gold medal after won the final match against Nicholas Choi of Hong Kong with the score 11–10. Choi settled for the silver medal, and the bronze medal goes to Son Young-ki of South Korea and Cheung Ka Long of Hong Kong.

Schedule
All times are Western Indonesia Time (UTC+07:00)

Results

Preliminaries

Pool A

Pool B

Pool C

Pool D

Pool E

Summary

Knockout round

Final

Top half

Bottom half

Final standing

References

Results

External links
Fencing at the 2018 Asian Games - Men's individual foil

Men's individual foil